Jozef or Józef is a Creole, Dutch, Breton, Polish and Slovak version of masculine given name Joseph. A selection of people with that name follows. For a comprehensive list see  and ..

 Józef Beck (1894–1944), Polish foreign minister in the 1930s
 Józef Bem (1794–1850), Polish general, Ottoman pasha and a national hero of Poland and Hungary
 Józef Bilczewski (1860–1923), Polish Catholic archbishop and saint
 Józef Brandt (1841–1915), Polish painter
 Jozef M.L.T. Cals (1914–1971), Dutch Prime Minister
 Józef Marian Chełmoński (1849–1914), Polish painter
 Jozef Chovanec (born 1960), Slovak footballer
 Jozef De Kesel (born 1947), Belgian cardinal of the Roman Catholic Church
 Jozef De Veuster (1840–1889), Belgian missionary better known as Father Damien
 Józef Elsner (1769–1854), Silesian composer, music teacher, and music theoretician
 Jozef Gabčík (1912–1942), Slovak soldier in the Czechoslovak army involved in Operation Anthropoid
 Jozef A.A. Geeraerts (1930–2015), Belgian writer
 Józef Grudzień (born 1939), Polish boxer and Olympic champion
 Józef Kazimierz Hofmann (1876–1957), Polish American pianist, composer, and inventor
 Jozef Israëls (1824–1911), Dutch painter
 Józef Klotz (1900–1941), Polish footballer 
 Jozef Lenárt (1923–2004), Slovak Prime Minister of Czechoslovakia 1963–68
 Józef Lustgarten (1899–1973), Polish footballer
 Jozef Moravčík (born 1945), Slovak diplomat and politician, Prime Minister of Slovakia in 1994
 Jozef Teodor Mousson (1887–1946), Slovak Impressionist painter
 Jozef Murgaš (1864–1929), Slovak inventor, architect, botanist, painter, and priest
 Jozef Peeters (1895–1960), Belgian painter
 Józef Piłsudski (1867–1935), Polish head of state and commander-in-chief of the armed forces
 Józef Pińkowski (1929–2000), Polish Communist politician, Prime Minister from 1980 to 1981
 Józef Poniatowski (1763–1813), Polish political and military leader
 Jozef Pribilinec (born 1960), Slovak racewalker
 Józef Rotblat (1908–2005), Polish physicist
 Józef Szajba (1910–1945), Polish sailor
 Józef Szmidt (born 1935), Polish retired triple jumper, world record holder and twice Olympic champion
 Jozef Stümpel (born 1972), Slovak former National Hockey League player
 Jozef Tiso (1887–1947), Slovak priest and puppet head of state of Slovakia from 1939 to 1945 executed for war crimes
 Jozef Tomko (1924–2022), Slovak Cardinal of the Roman Catholic Church
 Jozef Van Roey (1874–1961), Belgian Cardinal of the Roman Catholic Church
 Jozef Vengloš (born 1936), Slovak football coach
 Józef Andrzej Załuski (1702–1774), Polish Bishop of Kiev and bibliophile

See also
 Joseph
 Josef
 József

Dutch masculine given names
Polish masculine given names
Slovak masculine given names